Emin Ozmen (born 1985) is a Turkish photographer, photojournalist and film maker based in Istanbul. He has worked especially on Turkey, on refugees and in the wider Middle East, including Syria and Iraq.

In 2013 he founded a photography cooperative named Agence Le Journal, which is based in Istanbul.

In 2017, he became a nominee member of Magnum Photos.

Awards (selected) 
2014, Bayeux-Calvados Awards for war correspondents – Public Jury Photo Prize
2014, World Press Photo Multimedia Contest – 1st prize
2015, Magnum Photos Photographer Fund winner for 'Limbo' project

Exhibitions 
2013 Occupy Gezi, Netherlands, Amsterdam Mediamatic
2017 Les Limbes, Turkey, French Institute Istanbul

References

Turkish photographers
1985 births
Living people